Brachyusa is a genus of beetles belonging to the family Staphylinidae.

The genus was first described by Mulsant and Rey in 1873.

The species of this genus are found in Europe and Northern America.

Species:
 Brachyusa concolor (Erichson, 1839)

References

Aleocharinae
Staphylinidae genera